Ionuț Marius Avram (born 9 August 1979) is a Romanian former professional football referee who officiated primarily in the Liga I from 2007 to 2020, as well as for FIFA as a FIFA international referee from 2010 to 2020.

Avram became a FIFA referee in 2010. He has refereed at 2014 FIFA World Cup qualifiers, beginning with the match between Kazakhstan and Republic of Ireland.

He retired from refereeing on December 17 2020, and the last refereed match was FC Dinamo - CFR Cluj (Liga I).

References

External links
 Avram's page at frf-cca.ro

1979 births
Living people
Sportspeople from Bucharest
Romanian football referees